Khongsara is a village in Kota Tehsil in Bilaspur District of Chhattisgarh, India. It is located (66 km by train and 86 by road) north from the district headquarters Bilaspur, and 166 km from the state capital Raipur.

Khongsara Pin code is 495116 and postal head office is Belgahana.

Khongsara is surrounded by Takhatpur Tehsil towards South, Bilaspur Tehsil towards South, Pali Tehsil towards East, Lormi Tehsil towards west.

Bilaspur, Bilaspur, Mungeli, Akaltara are the nearby cities to Khongsara.

Demographics of Khongsara 
Chhattisgarhi is the Local Language here. For more details follow census of 2011.

Temples in Khongsara 
 Shiv Mandir 
 Khandoba Mandir 
 Kaal Bhairav Mahdir 
 Shiv Temple 
 Mahamaya Devi Mandir

Colleges in Khongsara,Kota 
 Dr. C. V. Raman University
 Global Public School Kota
 Drona College of IT and Applied Social Science

Schools in Khongsara 
 LBD International School Kargiroad Kota
 Government Higher Secondary School 
 Primary & Middle School 
 Government Higher Secondary School 
 Kasturba Gandhi School

References

Villages in Bilaspur district, Chhattisgarh